White Horse, Dark Dragon is a novel written in the style of magical realism by Robert C. Fleet, a political satire-adventure. Although the book was held up for publication for contractual reasons, it was finally published by Putnam/Berkley/Ace in 1993.

Plot summary 
The action takes place in a fictional Central European country, Karistan, where the beautiful Alta lives with her young blind daughter Jewel. Jewel has a friend in the form of an enigmatic white horse.  Soon they meet an American visitor named Jim Martin, who has been sent to Karistan to prove that a new investment is not going to harm the environment in Karistan.

Background 
The book is described by The Science Fiction Chronicle as "an interesting juxtaposition of fantasy and modern politics," and has become something of a cult novel due to its dry political humor satirizing late-era Communism and U.S. corporate boardrooms - mixed with action, historical romance and nuanced characters.

Film adaptation 
Legend of the White Horse (also known as Biały smok) is a 1987 Polish-American adventure movie for kids that is based on the novel, but altered significantly to tone down the satire elements.

1993 American novels
1993 fantasy novels
American satirical novels
American fantasy novels adapted into films
American adventure novels
American political novels
American magic realism novels